Gamba is an Italian surname. Notable people with the surname include:

 Enrico Gamba (1831–1883), Italian painter 
 Ezio Gamba (1958), Italian-Russian judoka and judo coach
 Fran Gamba, 18th century Slovenian politician
 Francesco Gamba (1818–1887), Italian painter, mainly of seascapes
 Giuseppe Gamba (1857–1929), Cardinal of the Roman Catholic Church and an Archbishop of Turin
 Paolo Ettore Gamba, Italian engineer
 Piero Gamba (born 1936), Italian orchestral conductor and pianist
 Marina Gamba (1570–1612), mother of Galileo Galilei's illegitimate children
 Matteo Gamba (born 1979), Italian rally driver
 Rumon Gamba (born 1972), English conductor
 Sandro Gamba (born 1932), Italian basketball coach and player
 Vincenzo Gamba (1606–1649), Italian musician, son of Galileo Galilei and Marina Gamba

Italian-language surnames